Ahsham-e Hasan (also Romanized as Aḩshām-e Ḩasan and Ahsham Hasan; also known as Khasham Ḩasan) is a village in Angali Rural District, in the Central District of Bushehr County, Bushehr Province, Iran. At the 2006 census, its population was 12, in 5 families.

References 

Populated places in Bushehr County